Jagath Kodithuwakku, RWP RSP ndu is a retired Sri Lankan general. He was the 60th Chief of Staff of the Sri Lanka Army(CoS) and former Deputy Chief of Staff of Sri Lanka Army. He also served as the Colonel of the Regiment of Sri Lanka Light Infantry.

Early life and education 
Jagath Kodithuwakku received his education from St. Aloysius College Galle. General Kodithuwakku completed his graduation from the University of Colombo and then went for his MS degree in Human Resource Management and a Post Graduate Diploma in Human Resource Advancement. He also completed another Postgraduate Diploma in Conflict Resolution and Security Studies from the University of Bradford in UK. He is also a distinguished graduate of Asia Pacific Centre for Security Studies USA.

Military career 
He enlisted in the Sri Lanka Army on 27 October 1986 to the Intake 26 and completed the basic training at the Sri Lanka Military Academy. After completion of officer training at Sri Lanka Military Academy (SLMA) and Pakistan Military Academy(PMA), Kodithuwakku was commissioned as a second lieutenant in the 3rd Battalion Sri Lanka Light Infantry. He served as the Commander Security Force - Jaffna before he joined at Deputy Chief office. He retired in November 2022 from the post "Chief of staff of the Army, Sri Lanka".

References 

Sri Lankan major generals
Sinhalese military personnel
Sri Lanka Light Infantry officers
Sri Lanka Military Academy graduates
1967 births
Living people